Simpatija is the sixth studio album by Serbian singer Dragana Mirković and the fourth to feature the band Južni Vetar. It was released in 1989.

This is Dragana's fourth album with Južni Vetar. They went on to record a total of five albums together, one was released each year beginning in 1986.

Track listing

References

1989 albums
Dragana Mirković albums